Plesiaceratherium is an extinct genus of rhinoceros. It includes two species: P. gracile from China and P. mirallesi from France.

Plesiaceratherium gracile was a mid-sized, hornless species of rhinoceros. Males had significantly larger incisors than females, and combined with their large body size it suggests that this species was polygynous and had a solitary lifestyle.

References

Miocene rhinoceroses